Crop milk is a secretion from the lining of the crop of parent birds that is regurgitated to young birds. It is found among all pigeons and doves where it is referred to as pigeon milk. An analog to crop milk is also secreted from the esophagus of flamingos and the male emperor penguin.

Description 
Crop milk bears little physical resemblance to mammalian milk. Crop milk is a semi-solid substance somewhat like pale yellow cottage cheese. It is extremely high in protein and fat, containing higher levels than cow or human milk. A 1939 study of pigeon crop milk showed, however, that the substance did not contain carbohydrates. It has also been shown to contain anti-oxidants and immune-enhancing factors which contribute to milk immunity. Like mammalian milk, crop milk contains IgA antibodies. It also contains some bacteria. Unlike mammalian milk, which is an emulsion, pigeon crop milk consists of a suspension of protein-rich and fat-rich cells that proliferate and detach from the lining of the crop. Lactation in birds is controlled by prolactin, which is the same hormone that causes lactation in mammals.

Pigeons 
Pigeon's milk begins to be produced a couple of days before the eggs are due to hatch. The parents may cease to eat at this point in order to be able to provide the squabs (baby pigeons and doves) with milk uncontaminated by seeds, which the very young squabs would be unable to digest. The baby squabs are fed on pure crop milk for the first week or so of life. After this the parents begin to introduce a proportion of adult food, softened by spending time in the moist conditions of the adult crop, into the mix fed to the squabs, until by the end of the second week they are being fed entirely on softened adult food.

Pigeons normally lay two eggs. If one egg fails to hatch, the surviving squab gets the advantage of a supply of crop milk sufficient for two squabs and grows at a significantly faster rate. Research suggests that a pair of breeding pigeons cannot produce enough crop milk to feed three squabs adequately, which explains why clutches are limited to two.

References

External links
 Article on Bird Milk from stanford.edu
 Article on the relationship between crop milk and clutch size in Mourning Doves (.pdf)
 Smithsonian National Zoo article on Common Crowned Pigeon, includes paragraph on crop milk

Domestic pigeons
Bird anatomy
Bird behavior
Milk by animal

de:Kropf#Kropfmilch